Masks is a comic based on the Angel television series.

This issue is a one-shot Halloween-themed annual featuring four special stories.

Stories

Cover art

The two covers were drawn by Jeremy Geddes and Zach Howard.

Canonical issues

Angel comics such as this one are not usually considered by fans as canonical. Some fans consider them stories from the imaginations of authors and artists, while other fans consider them as taking place in an alternative fictional reality. However unlike fan fiction, overviews summarising their story, written early in the writing process, were 'approved' by both Fox and Joss Whedon (or his office), and the books were therefore later published as officially Buffy merchandise.

Angel (1999 TV series) comics